Ricardo Pierre-Louis (born November 2, 1984 in Léogâne) is a Haitian soccer player, currently playing for Magic Soccer Academy Verrettes in 3rd division in Haiti. He is also the club owner.

Career

College and amateur
Pierre-Louis played college soccer at Lee University, where he was a three-time all-Southern States Athletic Conference selection in 2005, 2006 and 2007, the SSAC Newcomer of the Year in 2005, a two-time NAIA Region XIII Player of the Year in 2006 and 2007, a two-time NAIA first team all-American in 2006 and 2007, a NAIA Player of the Year in 2007, and Lee University's Athlete of the Year in 2005, 2006 and 2007 .

In 2007, he also played for the Cape Cod Crusaders in the USL Premier Development League.

Professional
Icon at Cavaly as Club Leogane Haiti. scored 34 goals, in 54 games with Cavaly. Ricardo is scary to rivalry Valencia defenders like Massillon, Smith Charmand and so forth.
Pierre-Louis was drafted in the second round (22nd overall) in the 2008 MLS SuperDraft by the Columbus Crew of Major League Soccer, he was part of the team that won the supporter shields and the MLS Cup that year, Pierre-Louis was waived by the crew and signed with the Cleveland City stars soon after.

He signed with the Cleveland City Stars of the USL First Division on March 17, 2009.

Coaching career
Pierre-Louis begun his coaching career soon after early retirement from pro soccer. Pierre-Louis started Magic Soccer F.C,a successful youth soccer club in Bismarck, ND. Pierre-Louis is a USFF “B” licensed coach. magic soccerskills.com
Pierre-Louis is a collegiate assistant coach. He has been the assistant coach at the university of Mary, NCAA II, since 2014.Umary mauraders.com

International

Pierre-Louis won Caribbean championships with the Haitian national U-17 and U-20 teams, was captain of the Haitian national U-20 team, and was a member of the senior Haiti squad which took part in the 2007 CONCACAF Gold Cup.

International goals
Scores and results list Haiti's goal tally first.

References

External links
 Cleveland City Stars bio
 MLS player profile
 Profile at HaitiFoot.com

1984 births
Living people
Cavaly AS players
Cape Cod Crusaders players
Cleveland City Stars players
Columbus Crew players
Haitian footballers
Haitian expatriate footballers
USL First Division players
2007 CONCACAF Gold Cup players
USL League Two players
Columbus Crew draft picks
Haiti international footballers
Association football forwards
Haitian expatriate sportspeople in the United States
Expatriate soccer players in the United States
Lee Flames men's soccer players